Urceolina urceolata is a perennial plant species in the family Amaryllidaceae. The species is native to Peru.

Plants can reach up to 20 or 30 centimeters in heights.

The species was first described and the name by Hipólito Ruiz López and José Antonio Pavon. But it was later revised and reclassified by Mary Letitia Green in 1930.

References 

Amaryllidoideae